WIAA may refer to:

 Wisconsin Interscholastic Athletic Association
 Washington Interscholastic Activities Association
 WIAA (FM), a radio station (88.7 FM) licensed to Interlochen, Michigan, United States
 Western India Automobile Association, an automobile association headquartered in Mumbai
 Women's International Association of Aeronautics, founded in 1929 by Elizabeth Lippincott McQueen